The 2021 Commonwealth Weightlifting Championships were held at the Uzbekistan Sport Complex and Gymnastics Sport Complex in Tashkent, Uzbekistan from 7 to 17 December 2021.

In agreement with the IWF, the event - having been postponed twice before (in Singapore and, from the previous year, Nauru) - was held within that year's World Championships. After the Omicron variant emerged, updated border restrictions rendered athletes from several Commonwealth countries unable to enter Uzbekistan, and Great Britain chose to send a small Worlds-only team not co-registered for Home Nations representation. Nonetheless, the championships went ahead and the winners in qualifying weight classes also secured their places at the 2022 Commonwealth Games.

Medal table

Medal summary

Men

Women

References

External links
Results book 

Weightlifting competitions
Weightlifting
 
Commonwealth Weightlifting Championships
Commonwealth Weightlifting Championships
International weightlifting competitions hosted by Uzbekistan
Sports competitions in Tashkent
Commonwealth Weightlifting Championships